Protocadherin-15 is a protein that in humans is encoded by the PCDH15 gene.

Function 

This gene is a member of the cadherin superfamily. Family members encode integral membrane proteins that mediate calcium-dependent cell-cell adhesion. The protein product of this gene consists of a signal peptide, 11 extracellular calcium-binding domains, a transmembrane domain and a unique cytoplasmic domain. It plays an essential role in maintenance of normal retinal and cochlear function. It is thought to interact with CDH23 to form tip-link filaments.

Clinical significance 

Mutations in this gene have been associated with hearing loss, which is consistent with its location at the Usher syndrome type 1F (USH1F) critical region on chromosome 10. Variation within it has also been found to be associated with normal differences in human facial appearance.

References

Further reading

External links 
  GeneReviews/NCBI/NIH/UW entry on Usher Syndrome Type I
 PDBe-KB provides an overview of all the structure information available in the PDB for Human Protocadherin-15 (PCDH15)